Llanrhystud is a seaside village and electoral division on the A487 road in the county of Ceredigion, in Wales, 9 miles (14 km) south of Aberystwyth, and 7 miles (11 km) north of Aberaeron. It takes its name from an early Welsh saint. The community includes the village of Llanddeiniol.

The Cofiwch Dryweryn stone wall (English: "Remember Tryweryn") lies on the A487 a mile north of the village.

History
The village is named after the early Christian Welsh St Rhystyd, to whom the local Church in Wales (Anglican) church is dedicated. Rhystyd was among missionaries who arrived from Armorica in the 6th century.

According to a leaflet in the Ceredigion Archives:

 

The first mention of an incumbent is of Griffith Powell, who "on July 24th 1582 was a witness before the Court Leet at Aberystwyth". The document adds that Powell had been "in 1544 appointed priest-in-charge of Llanrhystud at the yearly stipend of five pounds".

A castle once existed nearby.

Amenities
The village has a primary school, Ysgol Wirfoddol Myfenydd. It also has a memorial hall, which contains a memorial table to the local fallen in the two World Wars.

The village lies on the Ceredigion Coast Path, part of the Wales Coast Path.

There is a public house, the Black Lion, which also serves meals.

The village was once served by Llanrhystyd Road railway station, on the now dismantled Carmarthen–Aberystwyth line, nearly 7 miles (11.3 km) up the A487 road at the larger village of Llanfarian.

Population
The village had a population of 646 as of the 2011 census, and the wider community, 966. The electoral ward stretches beyond the confines of Llanrhystud to include the village of Llangwyryfon. It has a total population of 1,562.

Notable people
David Evans (died 1910), Archdeacon of St Asaph
David Edward Lewis (1866–1941), businessman and philanthropist in Australia

Gallery

External links
Llanrhystud Village Information
Llanrhystud – Ceredigion Historical Society
Llanrhystud – Extract from "A Topographical Dictionary of Wales" by Samuel Lewis 1833

References

Beaches of Ceredigion
Coast of Ceredigion
Villages in Ceredigion